is a railway station located in Ibusuki, Kagoshima, Japan.
The station opened in 1934.

Lines 
Kyushu Railway Company
Ibusuki Makurazaki Line

JR

Adjacent stations

Nearby places
Ibusuki Kita Post Office

References 

Railway stations in Kagoshima Prefecture
Railway stations in Japan opened in 1934
Ibusuki, Kagoshima